Sleeveface is an internet phenomenon wherein one or more persons obscure or augment body parts with record sleeve(s), causing an illusion.  Sleeveface has become popular on social networking sites.

The precise origin of the concept is unknown.  A collection of photographs was posted online at Waxidermy.com in early 2006, though earlier examples of 'Sleevefacing' include a Mad Magazine cover and a sketch on The Adam and Joe Show with Gary Numan holding a record sleeve to his face. Other cases include John Hiatt's 1979 Slug Line album on which he is holding a sleeve (showing his face) in front of his face. and the back of the 1982 album Picture This by Huey Lewis and the News, where Huey is holding the front side of the album (showing his face) in front of his face.  The artwork for J Rocc's 12" single 'Play This (One)' features men holding various LP sleeves over their faces.

The term 'Sleeveface' was coined in April 2007 by Cardiff resident Carl Morris after pictures were taken of him and his friends holding record sleeves to their faces whilst Djing in a Cardiff bar. His friend John Rostron posted them on the internet and created a group on the nascent Facebook social networking site. From this point, the craze started to become more widely known.

John Rostron and Carl Morris are authors of the book 'Sleeveface : Be The Vinyl' published in 2008 by Artisan/Workman which compiles sleevefaces from the worldwide submissions to their website www.sleeveface.com

Sleeveface contributors regularly hold Sleeveface parties across the world.

Sleeveface contributors have helped organise Sleeveface workshops for children. One such workshop took place at the National Museum Cardiff in November 2008 as part of the city's annual Sŵn Festival.

There is also a Sleevefacer iPhone app available that allows a user to access album artwork from a music library and sleeveface on an iPhone, iPad or iPod Touch.

References

External links
 Sleevefacer for iPhone, iPod touch (4th generation), iPod touch (5th generation), iPad 2 Wi-Fi, iPad 2 Wi-Fi + 3G, iPad (3rd generation), iPad Wi-Fi + 4G, iPad (4th generation), iPad Wi-Fi + Cellular (4th generation), iPad mini and iPad mini Wi-Fi + Cellular on the iTunes App Store
 Sleevefaced
 https://web.archive.org/web/20120425114428/http://www.sleevemyface.com/
 Sleeveface - people holding vinyl record sleeves and covers in front of their faces
 galeriephos.com
 Flickr gallery
 Waxidermy gallery
 Carl Morris

Internet culture